Tairona or Tayrona was a Pre-Columbian culture of Colombia, which consisted in a group of chiefdoms in the region of Sierra Nevada de Santa Marta in present-day Cesar, Magdalena and La Guajira Departments of Colombia, South America, which goes back at least to the 1st century AD and had significant demographic growth around the 11th century.

The Tairona people formed one of the two principal linguistic groups of the Chibchan family, the other being the Muisca.  Genetic and archaeological evidence shows a relatively dense occupation of the region by at least 200 BC. Pollen data compiled by Luisa Fernanda Herrera in 1980 shows considerable deforestation and the use of cultigens such as yuca and maize since possibly 1200 BC.  However, occupation of the Colombian Caribbean coast by sedentary or semi-sedentary populations has been documented to have occurred by c. 4000 BC. 

Ethnohistorical data shows that initial contact with the Spanish was tolerated by the Tairona; but by 1600 AD confrontations grew, and a small part of the Tairona population moved to the higher stretches of the Sierra Nevada de Santa Marta.  This movement allowed them to evade the worst of the Spanish colonial system during the 17th and 18th centuries. The indigenous Kogi, Wiwa, Arhuacos (Ijka, Ifca) and Kankuamo people who live in the area today are believed to be direct descendants of the Tairona.

Origin of the name 
Etymological similarities of the word Tairona survive in the four main linguistic groups of the Sierra Nevada de Santa Marta: in Sanca Language it is pronounced Teiruna, in Kankuamo language Teijua or Tairuna, and in Ijka, Teruna, meaning "Males" or "sons of the Jaguar."

Although Tairona may be an inaccurate name for the people who inhabited the region during the contact with the Spanish Empire, it has become the most common name for a hierarchical network of villages that developed around 900.  Initially it was used to refer to the inhabitants of a valley and probably a chiefdom named Tairo on the northern slope of the Sierra Nevada de Santa Marta. But by the 16th century, the Spanish used it for the whole group of complex chiefdoms in the area.  The groups in the northern and western Sierra Nevada were largely indistinguishable to the Spaniards, and became indistinguishable to archaeologists in more modern times.

Geographical location 

The archaeological sequence of the region spans from approximately 200 BC to the 17th century , when the Tairona were forcibly integrated into the Spanish Encomienda system. The coves and inlets on the Caribbean coast, like Chengue, Neguanje, Gayraca, Cinto and Buritaca, where villages have only more modest architecture, show the longest occupations, spanning the whole 1,800 years. 
 
Knowledge sources about the pre-Columbian Tairona civilization are limited to archaeological findings and a few written references from the Spanish colonial era. One of the first descriptions of the region was written by Pedro Martyr d' Anghiera and was published in 1530. The area also was described by other explorers who visited the region between 1505 and 1524.  Anghiera portrays the Tairona valleys as densely populated, with extensive fields irrigated in the same way as those in Tuscany.  Many villages were dedicated to fishing and traded their marine goods for the rest of their needs with those living inland.  Anghiera describes how they aggressively repelled the Spanish when they attempted to take women and children as slaves in the first contacts.  It appears that as a result, the first contacts with the Tairona were very violent and the Spanish suffered great losses, which resulted in a more diplomatic strategy from the first governor of Santa Marta, Rodrigo de Bastidas.

Cities 
One of the best-known Tairona nucleated villages and archaeological sites is known as Ciudad Perdida (Spanish for "Lost City"). It was a major city, about 13 hectares (32 acres) in the "core".  It was discovered by looters in 1975 but is now under the care of the Colombian Institute of Anthropology and History.  Recent studies suggest that it was inhabited by approximately 1,600 to 2,400 people that lived in at least 11,700 square meters (124,000 square feet) of roofed space, in about 184 round houses built on top of terraces paved with stone. There are many other sites of similar or greater size.

A larger site, Pueblito, is located near the coast. According to Reichel-Dolmatoff's research, it contains at least 254 terraces and had a population of about 3,000 people. Archaeological studies in the area show that even larger nucleated villages existed towards the western slope of the Sierra Nevada de Santa Marta, like Posiguieca and Ciudad Antigua.

Smaller villages and hamlets were part of a very robust exchange network of specialized communities, connected with stone-paved paths.  Villages that specialized in salt production and fishing, like Chengue in the Parque Tairona, are evidence of a robust Tairona political economy based on specialized staple production. Chengue contains at least 100 terraces and was inhabited by about 800 to 1,000 people in 15 hectares by 1400. The Tairona are known to have built stone terraced platforms, house foundations, stairs, sewers, tombs, and bridges. Use of pottery for utilitarian and ornamental or ceremonial purposes was also highly developed as a result of fairly specialized communities.

Arts and crafts 

The Tairona ceramic chronologies range from 200 BCE to 1650 CE, and the Caribbean coast of Colombia has evidence of ceramics from at least 2500 BCE.  Recent investigations in Chengue, Parque Tairona by the Colombian archaeologist Alejandro Dever show significant variations in the ceramic that allow for a chronological division of sequence into at least five phases.  The first phase, called Nahuange 1, appears to start at around 200 BCE and ends at around 500 CE when there appears to be a peak in the population.  A second phase spans from 500 AD to about 900 AD; it can be called Nehuange 2, and was called Buritaca after detailed excavations by Jack Wynn in the 1970s.  From c. 900 CE began what is commonly called the Tairona period, characterized by an impressive increase in the variation, size and number of ceramic forms, many conserving the styles from the Nehuange or Buritaca phases.  The Tairona 1 through 3 phases, from 900 to 1650, show significant local variations.  This was shown by numerous works done in the 1980s by Colombian archaeologists Augusto Oyuela, Carl Langebaek, Luisa Fernanda Herrera and Ana Maria Groot, and others.  During the Tairona period, the evidence for exchange increases as does the population of the entire region.  The causes for this population increase are not fully known but what is evident is the robust local exchange networks that emerge at this time.
 
The Tairona civilization is most renowned for its distinctive goldwork. The earliest known Tairona gold work has been described for the Neguanje Period (from about 300 to 800 AD). Its use in the Tairona society appears to have extended beyond the elite, although little proof of this exists. The gold artifacts consist of pendants, lip-plugs, nose ornaments, necklaces, and earrings. The Tairona cast a meltable mixture of gold, silver and copper called Tumbaga into intricate moulds using clay, sand, charcoal and lost wax. Depletion gilding, using controlled corrosion to remove copper from the surface, gave the appearance of solid gold. Cast Tairona figure pendants (known as "caciques") in particular stand out among the goldworks of pre-Columbian America because of their richness in detail. The figurines depict human subjects - probably the shamanic elite that ruled them - in ornate dresses and with a large animal mask over the face. Many elements of their body posture (e.g., hands on their hips) and dress signal an aggressive stance, and hence are interpreted by some as evidence for the power of the wearer and the bellicose nature of Tairona society at that time. Not only that, but recent revelations have shown that this was the first step of a process known as 'transformation', which involved members of the shaman elite putting on sub-labial ornaments, nose rings etc. to resemble certain bat species and extract powers from the animal, opening their eyes to a greater truth.

Religious beliefs 
At the time of the conquest, the Tairona had different traditional cultural practices than modern Native American populations.  Ethnographic sources highlight freedom to divorce and acceptance of homosexuality, which differed significantly from their Catholic conquerors. The Tairona religion, and to some extent modern Kogui religion, separate much of the domestic life between genders.  Modern scholars have determined that the descriptions of Tairona homosexuality were an attempt by the Catholic establishment to abolish the Tairona male meeting house, which was the site of intense and permanent religious activity. These rituals are believed to be very similar to those of the Kogui, modern descendants of some of the Tairona chiefdoms. Many of the adult men are involved in rituals, sometimes lasting days, and consisting mostly of coca chewing and meditation.

Tairona revolt and modern-day descendants 
In 1599, the Tairona revolted against the Spanish, apparently because economic and religious pressure from the Spanish had become intolerable.  The main aggression was the killing of priests and travellers along the roads connecting the Spanish city of Santa Marta and the Tairona centers of Bonda and the villages of Concha and Chengue.  Secondary targets were the churches and houses of known bureaucrats of the colonial administration.  However, these data are from Spanish testimonies from the trial against the Tairona chiefs in 1602.  The Chiefs of Chengue and Bonda were sentenced to death, their bodies dismembered, their villages burned, and much of the population was relocated and incorporated into the Encomienda system.  By the mid-17th century, many Tairona populations were completely abandoned and the region was engulfed by forest.

Their descendants today are the Kogi, Arhuaco, Wiwa, and Kankuamo people.

See also 

 Kogi
 Muisca
 Ciudad Perdida

References

Further reading

External links 
 
 Tairona and Kogi
 2007 Dever, Alejandro Social and Economic Development of a Specialized Community in Chengue, Parque Tairona, Colombia. Doctoral Dissertation, University of Pittsburgh
 National Geographic Article on the Sierra Nevada Indians
 Jeffrey Quilter and John W. Hoopes, Editors, 2003: Gold and Power in Ancient Costa Rica, Panama, and Colombia
 Pensamiento Arhuaco - Herrera de Turbay, Luisa Fernanda 1985 Agricultura aborigen y cambios de vegetación en la Sierra Nevada de Santa Marta - Banco de la República (FIAN), Bogotá

Indigenous peoples in Colombia
Indigenous culture of the Americas
Pre-Columbian cultures
Santa Marta
Sierra Nevada de Santa Marta